Fudbalski klub Sloga Meridian is an association football club from the city of Doboj in northern Republika Srpska an entity of Bosnia and Herzegovina. The club competes in the Premier League of Bosnia and Herzegovina and plays its home matches at Stadion Luke, which has a capacity of 3,000.

Players

Current squad

Historical list of managers
 Nedeljko Gojković
 Miroslav Brozović
 Franjo Glaser
 Dimitrije "Mita" Tadić
 Ivo Radovniković
 Ferid Salihović
 Ivan "Ivica" Mioč
 Radoslav Zubanović
 Fuad Bećarević 
 Sulejman Spahić 
 Mujo Mujkić
 Asim Saračević 
 Ismet Hadžiđulbić
 Emir Mulalić 
 Mehmed Mujkanović
 Radivoje "Rade" Vasiljević 
 Jefto Popadić 
 Branislav Petričević 
 Dejan Pešić
 Ljubiša Tripunović 
 Zoran Ćurguz 
 Zlatko Spasojević
 Zoran Ćurguz (2011–2013)
 Vedran Sofić (2013–2015)
 Mitar Lukić (2015–2017)
 Vedran Sofić (2017–2018)
 Danimir Milkanović (2018)
 Milan Draganović

References

External links
Club at BiHsoccer.

Association football clubs established in 1946
Football clubs in Republika Srpska
Football clubs in Bosnia and Herzegovina
Doboj
1946 establishments in Bosnia and Herzegovina